The 3rd Tank Brigade is a reserve armored formation of the Ukrainian Ground Forces.
The full name of the unit is 3rd Independent Tank Iron Brigade.

History

Formation
The brigade was formed in 2016. It was armed with T-72 tanks.

Russo-Ukrainian War

2022 Russian invasion of Ukraine
The brigade spent month leading up to new invasion by Russia, training up their reservists. Units mastered their BMPs, tanks and BM-21 Grad systems.
When on 24 February 2022, Russia invaded Ukraine, the unit was sent to help defend Kyiv. It took part in Battle of Izium (2022).

Current structure 
As of 2022 the brigade's structure is as follows:
 1st Tank Battalion
 2nd Tank Battalion
 3rd Tank Battalion
 Mechanized Battalion
 Brigade Artillery Group
 Headquarters & Target Acquisition Battery
 Self-propelled Artillery Battalion (2S3 Akatsiya)
 Self-propelled Artillery Battalion (2S1 Gvozdika)
 Rocket Artillery Battalion (BM-21 Grad)
 Anti-Aircraft Missile Artillery Battalion
 Logistic Battalion

Past commanders 
 Lieutenant Colonel Volodymyr Fedorchenko - 2019
 Colonel Roman Sheremet - 2021 - present

References

Brigades of the Ukrainian Ground Forces
Armoured brigades of Ukraine
Military units and formations of Ukraine in the war in Donbas
Military units and formations of the 2022 Russian invasion of Ukraine